Durairaj is a surname, usually for male and found predominantly in Tamil Nadu in India, meaning Emperor or King. Notable people with the surname include:

C. Durairaj (?–2014), Indian politician 
Nandha Durairaj (born 1977), Indian actor
Ramachandran Durairaj (born 1976), Indian actor
T. S. Durairaj (1910–1986), Indian comedian, drama artist, producer, and director
Manoj Durairaj (1971–), Indian heart surgeon, Pune, awarded Pro Ecclesia et Pontifice